Greer is a unisex given name. Notable people called Greer include:

Women
 Greer Barnes (soccer) (born 1987), American soccer defender
 Greer Garson, CBE (1904–1996), British-American actress very popular during the Second World War
 Greer Gilman, American author of fantasy stories
 Greer Goodman, co-writer of 2000 romantic comedy film The Tao of Steve
 Greer Grammer (born 1992), American actress and former beauty queen
 Greer Honeywill (born 1945), Australian conceptual artist
 Greer Lankton (1958–1996), American artist known for creating lifelike, sewn dolls modelled on friends and celebrities
 Greer Robson (born 1971), New Zealand television actress known for a role in the TV drama Shortland Street
 Greer Shephard, American television producer and director
 Greer Stevens (born 1957), retired professional tennis player from South Africa

Men
 Greer Barnes (comedian) (born 1964), American comedian and actor
 Greer Grimsley (born 1956), American bass-baritone with an international opera career for the last three decades
 Greer Skousen (1916–1988), Mexican basketball player who competed in the 1936 Summer Olympics
 Greer Twiss (born 1937), New Zealand sculptor

See also
 Greer (disambiguation)
 Greer (surname)

Unisex given names